The following is a list of All-American Girls Professional Baseball League players who formed part of the circuit  during its twelve years of existence.

See also
 List of All-American Girls Professional Baseball League players (D–G)
 List of All-American Girls Professional Baseball League players (H–L)
 List of All-American Girls Professional Baseball League players (M–R)
 List of All-American Girls Professional Baseball League players (S–Z)

A

B

C

  * Callaghan also played under her married name of Helen Candaele.

References

A